John Fitzgerald Veldman (born 24 February 1968) is a Dutch former footballer who played as a defender. Veldman spent his entire career in the Eredivisie, playing 297 matches from 1986 to 2001. He began his professional career at PSV Eindhoven, then moved on to Willem II, Sparta Rotterdam, Ajax, Vitesse and RBC Roosendaal. While at Sparta, he started in various defensive positions and helped the club reach the final of the KNVB Cup in 1996.

Veldman earned a single cap for the Netherlands national football team, which came on 24 April 1996 in a 1–0 loss to Germany. He was included in the Dutch squad for Euro 1996 but did not make an appearance.

His brother, Elfried Veldman, died in the crash of Surinam Airways Flight 764.

References

voetbal international profile

1968 births
Living people
Sportspeople from Paramaribo
Association football defenders
Dutch footballers
Netherlands international footballers
UEFA Euro 1996 players
Sparta Rotterdam players
Willem II (football club) players
PSV Eindhoven players
AFC Ajax players
RBC Roosendaal players
SBV Vitesse players
Eredivisie players
Surinamese emigrants to the Netherlands